Thorsteinn Sindri Baldvinsson Blyden, (born March 9, 1996) better known by his stage name Stony Blyden, is an Icelandic actor, rapper, singer, drummer and record producer.

Life
Blyden was born in Reykjavík, Iceland. His father, Baldvin, is an Icelandic baker and his mother, Deborah, a Cuban fitness instructor. Blyden began drumming at an early age.

Career
For his musical artist name, he chose Stony, which is a rough translation of the second part of his Icelandic name, Thorsteinn, "Thor stone." Using a camera he borrowed from his father he started filming him and his friends covering various songs.  He then went on to upload his own drum covers to YouTube under the name Stony's World. He also created pop-inspired remixes of the Jake and Amir comedy web series produced by CollegeHumor, receiving millions of views on YouTube and a substantial number of purchases on ITunes. In a collaboration with Jake and Amir in 2019, Blyden stated that the proceeds from these remixes "got [him] through school" and that he continues to receive money from the songs to this day. As an actor, Blyden has appeared in the films The Standoff and Hope Springs Eternal, as well as the Hulu television series Casual. He stars in the 2017 Nickelodeon television series Hunter Street.

Filmography

Television

Film

Discography
2014: Feel Good

References

External links
 
 
 

21st-century American drummers
21st-century American rappers
American drummers
American hip hop singers
American male actors
American male rappers
American record producers
Stony Blyden
Stony Blyden
Stony Blyden
Stony Blyden
Living people
Underground rappers
1993 births
21st-century American male musicians